Marriage Italian Style is a 1964 romantic comedy-drama film directed by Vittorio De Sica, starring Sophia Loren and Marcello Mastroianni.

The film was adapted by Leonardo Benvenuti, Renato Castellani, Piero De Bernardi, and Tonino Guerra from the play Filumena Marturano by Eduardo De Filippo. Filumena Marturano had previously been adapted as a 1950 Argentine film.

Plot
Set during the World War II era, the film follows a cynical but successful 28-year-old businessman named Domenico (Marcello Mastroianni), who, after meeting a naive 17-year-old country girl, Filumena (Sophia Loren), during a bombing outside a Neapolitan brothel, starts an on-again, off-again relationship spanning 22 years. From the very beginning, Filumena is deeply in love with Domenico, but her love is not reciprocated. After Filumena expresses her wish to be solely his woman, Domenico arranges a leased home for her, with Rosalie as a maid and Alfredo (Aldo Puglisi) as the butler, and arranges a job for her in his shop. He eventually takes her into his house as a semi-official mistress under the pretence that she is the niece of Carmela (his mother's former maid) there to take care of his ailing, senile mother. Domenico's mindset about Filumena's past keeps him from taking their relationship seriously.

After having fallen for the 20-year-old cashier in his store, Domenico (now 50) plans to marry her. But he finds himself cornered when Filumena feigns illness and, while "on her deathbed", asks him to marry her. Thinking she will be dead in a matter of hours and the marriage won't even be registered, he agrees. After having been proclaimed his legal bride, the shrewd and resourceful Filumena drops the charade of feigning death. This sends Domenico into a fit of rage, as he feels that Filumena tricked him for his money. But Filumena reveals the real reason for the marriage: she did it for the three children that she bore (Umberto, Riccardo, and Michele). As the children were coming of age, she wanted them to have Domenico's family name.

Domenico won't accept this and decides to contest the marriage. The law rules in his favour and the marriage is annulled. Filumena accepts the annulment but tells Domenico that he had fathered one of the children. She does not say which one, as she considers all of them as equal. However, she gives him a hint that his child was conceived on the night Domenico said "to pretend we are in love" and gave her a 100-lira note on which she wrote the date of that night. She gives that note to Domenico. Domenico is visibly rattled by this revelation but can't solve the clue.

Domenico tries desperately to figure out which child he had fathered. He visits the children at their workplace and tries other means but hits a dead end.

He meets up with Filumena and tries to force an answer out of her but she reveals nothing more. As a last resort, Domenico decides to confront the children directly, but Filumena vehemently opposes this, as the prospect of Domenico's money would drive a wedge between the children. As they scuffle, they tumble down and fall into each other's arms. The couple then proclaims their love for each other with a kiss and decides to remarry.

At the church, the boys wait, and Domenico arrives. Domenico mentions that, because he will be marrying their mother, he will give them his name. He continues to prod them for clues but again comes out with nothing, as they each share some of his traits. Filumena rushes in; Domenico, smiling with joy, tells her how wonderful she looks, and the marriage takes place.

Back at home, the sons bid their mother goodnight. As the boys, one after another, say goodnight to their father, Domenico, he smiles broadly at this and says that he will see them tomorrow.

Filumena sits and weeps with joy at this. When Domenico asks why she is crying, she states that it feels wonderful to cry.

Cast
 Sophia Loren as Filumena Marturano
 Marcello Mastroianni as Domenico Soriano
 Aldo Puglisi as Alfredo
 Tecla Scarano as Rosalia
 Marilù Tolo as Diana
 Gianni Ridolfi as Umberto
 Generoso Cortini as Michele
 Vito Moricone as Riccardo
 Rita Piccione as Teresina, seamstress
 Lino Mattera
 Alfio Vita as pastry chef
 Alberto Castaldi as (credited as Alberto Gastaldi)
 Anna Santoro
 Enza Maggi as Lucia, maid
 Mara Marilli

Reception and awards
The film was received favourably. The New York Times noted that it was the fourth quality collaboration between director Vittorio De Sica and Sophia Loren, and the second to include Marcello Mastroianni in the mix, with the "warmup" for this movie having been 1963's Yesterday, Today and Tomorrow. The review described it as a "wonderfully flamboyant" film, and provided some context for the film, noting that Naples (at least in 1964) was "a quite unusual place, where the people are highly individual and may have bizarre relationships."

It was the second-highest-grossing Italian film in Italy for the year, behind A Fistful of Dollars, with a gross of $3,725,000.

The film was nominated for two Academy Awards: Best Foreign Language Film in 1965, and Best Actress in a Leading Role (for Loren) in 1964. It was also entered into the 4th Moscow International Film Festival.

See also
 List of submissions to the 38th Academy Awards for Best Foreign Language Film
 List of Italian submissions for the Academy Award for Best Foreign Language Film

References

External links

 
 

1964 films
1964 comedy-drama films
1964 romantic comedy films
1960s French films
1960s Italian films
1960s Italian-language films
1960s romantic comedy-drama films
Films about marriage
Films based on works by Eduardo De Filippo
Films directed by Vittorio De Sica
Films produced by Carlo Ponti
Films scored by Armando Trovajoli
Films set in Naples
French films based on plays
French romantic comedy-drama films
Italian films based on plays
Italian remakes of foreign films
Italian romantic comedy-drama films
Remakes of Argentine films